Per Berthelsen (born 1950 in Qeqertarsuaq) is a Greenlandic politician. 

He is the founder and former party leader of the Demokraatit (Democratic) Party, and works as a teacher in Nuuk. He was first elected to the municipal council in Nuuk Municipality in 1993, and was first elected to the national parliament in 1993. He was one of the founding members of the pioneering Greenlandic rock band Sume.

He has worked in a variety of roles, and has been leader of Katuaq since 1998. 

When Nuuk Municipality elected a new mayor in 2007, following the death of Agnethe Davidsen, Berthelsen was the Democrats' candidate, but lost out to Nikolaj Heinrich by just three votes. 

His father, Rasmus Berthelsen, was also a politician, and was mayor of Nuuk. His stepdaughter is the singer Julie Berthelsen.

References

External links
 Nordic Council - Per Berthelsen

Members of the Parliament of Greenland
1950 births
Living people
People from Qeqertarsuaq